Poppy Wilson (born 6 August 1999) is an English footballer currently playing for Watford in the FA Women's National League South.

Club career

Bristol City
Wilson joined Bristol City's academy in 2014, enrolling at SGS College to continue her studies while training with Bristol. She captained the college team to the English Colleges Football Association (ECFA) Cup title. In 2017, Wilson captained the Bristol City Development Squad to the Development League FA Cup victory.

In 2016, Wilson made her Bristol City senior team debut in a 2–0 WSL Cup defeat to Sheffield FC, making more regular appearances in the 2017–18 season. Wilson signed her first professional contract with the club in January 2018. On 3 February 2019, Wilson scored her first senior goal in a 3–0 FA Cup fourth round win over Wimbledon.

London City Lionesses
Ahead of the 2019–20 season, Wilson moved to newly-formed London City Lionesses for their inaugural season and made her debut for the club starting in the season opening victory over London Bees.

Watford FC Women
Ahead of the 2022–23 season, Wilson signed for Watford F.C. Women.

International career
Wilson is a youth international having represented England at under-17, under-18, under-19 and under-21 levels.

References

External links
Bristol City profile
 
 

1999 births
Living people
Women's association football midfielders
Bristol City W.F.C. players
Women's Super League players
English women's footballers
London City Lionesses players